Platanias (Greek: Πλατανιάς) is a village and municipality on the Greek island of Crete. The seat of the municipality is the village Gerani. Platanias (and the neighbouring village of Agia Marina) is a popular tourism village with beaches, several hotels, restaurants, bars, nightclubs and souvenir shops. The area is especially popular with Scandinavian tourists with the season running from April to October. Not far from the coast is the island of Agioi Theodoroi.

Municipality
The municipality Platanias was formed at the 2011 local government reform by the merger of the following 4 former municipalities, that became municipal units:
Kolymvari
Mousouroi
Platanias
Voukolies

It lies within the Chania regional unit and is numbered 6 on the map of the Chania region. It is on the north coast, forming the eastern shore of Kissamos Bay (Kolpos Kissamou Kόλπος Κισσάμου), and the west and south shores of Chania Bay (Kolpos Chanion Κόλπος Χανίων). It is bordered by Kissamos (5) to the west, Kantanos-Selino (4) to the south, Chania (1) to the east, and Sfakia (7) in the southeast. Its northeast region is the Rodopos Peninsula (Chersonisos Rodopou Χερσόνησος Ροδωπού).

Historical population

Gallery

References

External links
See Chania Region for maps

Municipalities of Crete
Populated places in Chania (regional unit)